Paradiabantia is a monotypic genus of praying mantises in the family Thespidae. It is represented by the single species, Paradiabantia perparva.

See also
List of mantis genera and species

References

Thespidae